Gerhard Bowitzky is a German paracanoeist who has competed since the late 2000s. He won a silver medal in the V-1 200 m LTA, TA, A event at the 2010 ICF Canoe Sprint World Championships in Poznań.

External links
 2010 ICF Canoe Sprint World Championships men's V-1 200 m LTA, TA, A results.- accessed 20 August 2010.

Year of birth missing (living people)
Living people
German male canoeists
Paracanoeists of Germany
LTA classification paracanoeists
ICF Canoe Sprint World Championships medalists in paracanoe